L. Joan MacAlpine-Stiles (known earlier in her career as Joan MacAlpine) is a politician in the province of New Brunswick, Canada.  She served as Member of the Legislative Assembly (MLA) for Moncton West from 1999 until 2010.  She is the wife of fellow MLA Wally Stiles; they were married while in office in 2005.

She previously served in the province's cabinet from 1999 to 2006.

MacAlpine was elected to the Moncton City Council in 1992, 1995 and 1998 before resigning to accept her seat in the legislature.

On April 17, 2007, she announced that she would cross the floor to join the Liberal party, along with her husband and fellow MLA Wally Stiles. She did not stand for reelection in 2010.

Election results

2006 election

|Progressive Conservative
|Joan MacAlpine-Stiles||align=right|3317||align=right|52.40||align=right|+4.69||align=right|$23,231
|-

|Liberal
|Gene Joseph Devereaux||align=right|3013||align=right|47.60||align=right|+6.46||align=right|$15,604
|-
|colspan=3 align=right|Total valid votes/expense limit||align=right|6330||align=right|100.00||align=right colspan=2|$30,367
|-
|colspan=3 align=right|Total rejected ballots||align=right|61||align=right|0.54||colspan=2|
|-
|colspan=3 align=right|Turnout||align=right|6391||align=right|56.96||align=right|+1.00|||
|-
|colspan=3 align=right|Electors on list||align=right|11,221||colspan=3|
|-
|bgcolor="#9999FF"|   
|style="width: 180px" colspan=2|Progressive Conservative hold
|align=right|Swing||align=right|-0.89||colspan=2|
|}

2003 election

|Progressive Conservative
|Joan MacAlpine||align=right|3143||align=right|47.71||align=right|-6.20||align=right|$21,525
|-

|Liberal
|Norman Branch||align=right|2710||align=right|41.14||align=right|+4.56||align=right|$14,473
|-

|NDP
|Stéphane Drysdale||align=right|437||align=right|6.63||align=right|-2.87||align=right|$0
|-

|Independent
|John Gallant||align=right|226||align=right|3.43||align=right|*||align=right|not filed
|-

|Grey Party
|Jean-Marc (Diggit) Dugas||align=right|72||align=right|1.09||align=right|*||align=right|not filed
|-
|colspan=3 align=right|Total valid votes/expense limit||align=right|6588||align=right|100.00||align=right colspan=2|$30,801
|-
|colspan=3 align=right|Total rejected ballots||align=right|41||align=right|0.35||colspan=2|
|-
|colspan=3 align=right|Turnout||align=right|6629||align=right|55.96||align=right|-11.57|||
|-
|colspan=3 align=right|Electors on list||align=right|11,847||colspan=3|
|-
|bgcolor="#9999FF"|   
|style="width: 180px" colspan=2|Progressive Conservative hold
|align=right|Swing||align=right|-5.38||colspan=2|
|}

1999 election

|Progressive Conservative
|Joan MacAlpine||align=right|3898||align=right|53.91||align=right|+36.27||align=right|$19,681
|-

|Liberal
|Jim Lockyer||align=right|2645||align=right|36.58||align=right|-25.25||align=right|$17,326
|-

|NDP
|Teresa Sullivan||align=right|687||align=right|9.50||align=right|+1.26||align=right|$2,650
|-
|colspan=3 align=right|Total valid votes/expense limit||align=right|7230||align=right|100.00||align=right colspan=2|$24,708
|-
|colspan=3 align=right|Total rejected ballots||align=right|22||align=right|0.20||colspan=2|
|-
|colspan=3 align=right|Turnout||align=right|7252||align=right|67.53||align=right|+4.81|||
|-
|colspan=3 align=right|Electors on list||align=right|10,739||colspan=3|
|-
|bgcolor="#9999FF"|   
|style="width: 180px" colspan=2|Progressive Conservative gain from Liberal
|align=right|Swing||align=right|+30.76||colspan=2|
|}

Notes

References 
 
 

Living people
Members of the Executive Council of New Brunswick
New Brunswick Liberal Association MLAs
Progressive Conservative Party of New Brunswick MLAs
Women MLAs in New Brunswick
Moncton city councillors
Women government ministers of Canada
Women municipal councillors in Canada
21st-century Canadian politicians
21st-century Canadian women politicians
Year of birth missing (living people)